Pamplemousses is a district of Mauritius, located in the northwest of the island, and is one of the most densely populated parts of the island. The name of the district comes from the French word for grapefruits. The district has an area of 178.7 km2 and the population estimate was at 139,966 as of 31 December 2015.

Places of interest

The district hosts the SSR botanical garden, or Jardin Botanique Sir Seewoosagur Ramgoolam, renamed in 1988 in honor of the first prime minister of Mauritius. The garden was first constructed by Pierre Poivre (1719–1786) in 1770. The area is 25 hectares. The garden features spices, ebonies, sugar canes and many more. It also features lotuses as well as 85 varieties of palms from Central America, Asia, Africa and the islands around the Indian Ocean.  The district is the home of the Pamplemousses SC local football team.

Places
The Pamplemousses District include different regions; however, some regions are further divided into different suburbs.

 Arsenal
 Baie-du-Tombeau
 Belle Vue Harel
 Calebasses
 Congomah
 Crève-Cœur
 D'Épinay
 Fond du Sac
 Grand Baie (Eastern part in Rivière du Rempart District)
 Le Hochet
 Montagne Longue
 Mapou (Northern part in Rivière du Rempart District)
 Morcellement Saint-André
 Notre-Dame
 Pamplemousses
 Piton (Eastern part in Rivière du Rempart District)
 Plaine-des-Papayes
 Pointe-aux-Piments
 Terre-Rouge
 Triolet
 Trou-aux-Biches
 Ville-Bague (Eastern part in Rivière du Rempart District)

See also

 Districts of Mauritius
 List of places in Mauritius

References 

 
Districts of Mauritius